Charles Kendall Adams (January 24, 1835 – July 26, 1902) was an American educator and historian. He served as the second president of Cornell University from 1885 until 1892, and as president of the University of Wisconsin from 1892 until 1901.  At Cornell he established a new law school, built a library, and appointed eminent research professors for the Ivy League school. At Wisconsin, he negotiated ever-increasing appropriations from the state legislature, especially for new buildings such as the library.  He was the editor-in-chief of Johnson's Universal Cyclopaedia (1892–1895), and of the successor Universal Cyclopaedia (1900), sometimes referred to as Appleton's Universal Cyclopaedia.

Biography
He was born on January 24, 1835, in Derby, Vermont, and he attended the common schools in that place till 1855, when, with his parents, he emigrated to Denmark, Iowa, where he entered an academy and commenced the study of Latin and Greek with the purpose of entering college. In the summer of 1857 he began the classical course at the University of Michigan, where he studied with Andrew Dickson White, Cornell's first president, and from where he graduated in 1861.

Taking a post-graduate course of study, he was employed to teach one of the classes in history, and at the end of the year was appointed instructor of history and Latin. In 1863 Adams became assistant professor of Latin and history at Michigan, a position which he held till 1867, when he became full professor of history until 1885. In 1867 and 1868, was spent in Germany having studied in the universities of Bonn, Heidelberg, Leipzig, Berlin, and Munich, where his object was to observe the methods of advanced instruction; about four months were passed in Italy and France, chiefly in Rome and Paris. In 1869 and 1870 established an historical seminary which proved of great value in promoting the study of history and political science. In 1881 he was made non-resident professor of history at Cornell, and in 1885 succeeded White as president of Cornell. He was forced to resign at Cornell due to conflicts with the faculty over honorary degrees and control of faculty appointments. Also in 1881, he was simultaneously invited to the presidency of the University of Kansas and the University of Nebraska, both of which positions were declined.

He received the honorary degree of LL.D. from the University of Chicago in 1874, and from Harvard in 1886. In 1887 Adams was elected a member of the American Antiquarian Society. In 1890 he was president of the American Historical Association. He resigned his professorship in May, 1892, and in July of the same year he was elected president of the University of Wisconsin, where he remained until October 11, 1901. He died on July 26, 1902, in Redlands, California, where he had moved in hopes of improving his health.

Works
 Democracy and Monarchy in France (1871)
 Manual of Historical Literature (1882)
 Representative British Orations (1884)
 Christopher Columbus, His Life and Work (1892)

References

Further reading
 Ely, Richard T. "Charles Kendall Adams." Wisconsin Alumnus (1941): 303–312.

External links

 
 
 Cornell Presidency: Charles Kendall Adams
 Cornell University Library Presidents Exhibition: Charles Kendall Adams (Presidency; Inauguration)

1835 births
1902 deaths
19th-century American historians
19th-century American male writers
Cornell University Department of History faculty
Educators from Iowa
Educators from Michigan
Educators from Vermont
Educators from Wisconsin
Founders of schools in the United States
Leaders of the University of Wisconsin-Madison
Members of the American Antiquarian Society
People from Derby, Vermont
People from Lee County, Iowa
Presidents of Cornell University
Presidents of the American Historical Association
University of Michigan alumni
University of Michigan faculty
19th-century American philanthropists
American male non-fiction writers
Historians from Iowa